Karlová is a village and municipality in Martin District in the Žilina Region of northern Slovakia.

History
In historical records the village was first mentioned in 1272.

Geography
The municipality lies at an altitude of 468 metres and covers an area of 1.833 km². It has a population of about 114 people.

Genealogical resources

The records for genealogical research are available at the state archive "Statny Archiv in Bytca, Slovakia"

 Roman Catholic church records (births/marriages/deaths): 1690-1950 (parish B)
 Lutheran church records (births/marriages/deaths): 1785-1929 (parish B)

See also
 List of municipalities and towns in Slovakia

External links
 
Surnames of living people in Karlova

Villages and municipalities in Martin District